Mesosphaerum suaveolens, synonym Hyptis suaveolens, the pignut or chan, is a branching pseudocereal plant native to tropical regions of Mexico, Central, the West Indies, and South America, as well as being naturalized in tropical parts of Africa, Asia and Australia. Stems are hairy, and square in cross section. Flowers are pink or purple, arranged in clusters of 1–5 in the upper leaf axils.

Traditional Uses
Studies have found that M. suaveolens is effective as an insecticide.

Mesosphaerum suaveolens can be made into a refreshing drink by soaking the seeds in water and refrigerating the mix. Some people add lemon or other citrus to improve the taste. In Colima, Mexico, people use the M. suaveolens seeds to prepare a traditional beverage called bate. The process consists in roasting and grinding the seeds and then mixing the resulting powder with water.  M. suaveolens is also a traditional treatment for diarrhea.

See also
 Salvia hispanica

References

External links

 Making Chan drink (spanish)
 Using Chan as insecticide (spanish)
 Evaluation as Alternative Crop for Food and Drugs  (spanish)
 Protein value of Chan (spanish) 
 Chan used as diarrhea treatment (spanish)
 

Lamiaceae
Edible nuts and seeds
Flora of Mexico
Flora of Central America
Flora of South America
Flora of the Caribbean
Plants described in 1759
Flora without expected TNC conservation status